John Charles Werhas (born February 7, 1938 in Highland Park, Michigan) is a former Major League Baseball third baseman who was a pastor for The Rock Community Church in Anaheim Hills, California. He retired from this position on August 23, 2015 and moved to Oregon to spend time with his wife of many years.

Werhas was an All-American third baseman for the University of Southern California Trojans baseball team. He also played forward for the Trojans basketball team, earning All-PCC honors and honorable-mention All-American recognition in 1959.

He batted .248 with 26 home runs and 127 runs batted in through three seasons in the minors before having a breakthrough  season with the Spokane Indians. He edged out Ken McMullen for the Dodgers' starting third base job out of spring training . After batting just .169 with eight RBIs through the first 33 games of the season, however, he was displaced by Jim Gilliam, who started the season playing second base. Werhas enjoyed a career game shortly after losing his starting job on May 28, going three-for-four with a walk and run scored in a seventeen-inning marathon with the Cincinnati Reds that ended in a 2-2 tie, but was soon returned to Spokane, regardless. He batted .309 with nine home runs and 51 RBIs for Spokane.

He returned to the Dodgers when rosters expanded in September , going hitless with one walk and a run scored in three pinch hit plate appearances. The only time Werhas took the field was at first base in the final game of the season.

On June 4, he hit his first major league home run off the Minnesota Twins' Jim Merritt. His only other major league home run came later that month against the Cleveland Indians' Sam McDowell.

Werhas' final major league at bat came with the Angels that season. In the first trade between a Japanese and an American team, he was dealt to the San Diego Padres' Pacific Coast League affiliate, the Hawaii Islanders, for longtime major leaguer Clete Boyer. He retired following the  season.

Werhas and his wife, Kay, have two children. His daughter is married to former Minnesota Twins and New York Yankees pitcher Dan Naulty.

References

External links

1938 births
Living people
Major League Baseball third basemen
Los Angeles Dodgers players
California Angels players
USC Trojans baseball players
USC Trojans men's basketball players
Hawaii Islanders players
Macon Dodgers players
Spokane Indians players
San Diego Padres (minor league) players
Eugene Emeralds players
Green Bay Dodgers players
Greenville Spinners players
Atlanta Crackers players
Baseball players from Michigan
Los Angeles Lakers draft picks
People from Highland Park, Michigan
People from Anaheim Hills, California
American men's basketball players
Forwards (basketball)